Michel Ettore (born 14 October 1957) is a French former professional footballer.

Club career
He spent most of his career with FC Metz.

References

1957 births
Living people
People from Amnéville
Association football goalkeepers
French footballers
FC Metz players
Quimper Kerfeunteun F.C. players
SC Toulon players
Ligue 1 players
Sportspeople from Moselle (department)
FC Metz non-playing staff
Footballers from Grand Est